The STK CMCR is an assault rifle made by ST Kinetics of Singapore.

The rifle was unveiled at the Singapore Airshow 2014. The STK CMCR is designed to fire 5.56×45mm NATO ammunition and ST Kinetics’ Extended Range 5.56mm ammunition, and comes standard with MIL-STD-1913 Picatinny rails at the three, six, nine and 12 o'clock positions.

See also 
 BR18

References

5.56×45mm NATO assault rifles
Assault rifles of Singapore